Fimbristylis depauperata is a sedge of the family Cyperaceae that is native to Australia.

It blooms between February to August and produces green-brown flowers.

In Western Australia it is found around swamps, seepage areas and along creeks and streams in the Kimberley region where it grows in gravelly sandy-clay soils often containing laterite.

References

Plants described in 1810
Flora of Western Australia
depauperata
Taxa named by Robert Brown (botanist, born 1773)